The men's 5000 metres event at the 2003 European Athletics U23 Championships was held in Bydgoszcz, Poland, at Zawisza Stadion on 20 July.

Medalists

Results

Final
20 July

Participation
According to an unofficial count, 22 athletes from 16 countries participated in the event.

 (1)
 (2)
 (2)
 (1)
 (3)
 (1)
 (2)
 (1)
 (1)
 (1)
 (1)
 (1)
 (1)
 (1)
 (1)
 (2)

References

5000 metres
5000 metres at the European Athletics U23 Championships